This is a bibliography of notable works about Nepal.

Nepal history books

Biography

Travelogues

Biodiversity

See also
 History of Nepal

Books about India
Nepal